The 2011 Ukrainian Cup Final was a football match that was played at the Yuvileiny Stadium, Sumy, on 25 May 2011. The match was the 20th Ukrainian Cup Final and was contested by Dynamo Kyiv and Shakhtar Donetsk. This was the first time a Ukrainian Cup final was played in Sumy.

Since this match was between two teams that had qualified for the 2011–12 UEFA Champions League, the sixth-placed team in the 2010–11 Ukrainian Premier League season would qualify for the 2011–12 UEFA Europa League. In the draw, Dynamo was selected as the home team. After a goalless first half, Shakhtar's superiority prevailed and they won the match 2–0, enabling them to win the Ukrainian treble of the Ukrainian Super Cup, the Premier League and the Ukrainian Cup.

Road to Sumy 

As Ukrainian Premier League members Shakhtar Donetsk and Dynamo Kyiv did not have to go through the qualification round to get into the competition.

Previous encounters 
This was the sixth Ukrainian Cup final between the two teams. Dynamo had defeated Shakhtar three times out of the five Cup Finals. In the last final, however, in 2008, Shakhtar was victorious. The two teams also met in a semi final in 2008–09 and in the quarter-final in 2009–10 in which Shakhtar was victorious in both games.

Dynamo had appeared in 11 finals, winning 9, while opponents Shakhtar had appeared in 10 finals, winning 6.

Television 
The match was broadcast on ICTV in Ukraine.

Match

Details

MAN OF THE MATCH
Fernandinho (Shakhtar Donetsk)

MATCH OFFICIALS
Assistant referees:
 Vitaliy Demyanenko (Mukachevo)
 Mykola Vasyuta (Rivne)
Fourth official: Ihor Pokyd'ko (Poltava)

MATCH RULES
90 minutes.
30 minutes of extra-time if necessary.
Penalty shoot-out if scores still level.
Seven named substitutes
Maximum of 3 substitutions.

Post-match 
On account of Shakhtar's victory and Dynamo's defeat in the final, and with both team finishing as the top two teams in the 2010–11 Ukrainian Premier League, the 2011 Ukrainian Super Cup would feature both teams.

See also
 2010–11 Ukrainian Premier League

References

Cup Final
Ukrainian Cup finals
Ukrainian Cup Final 2011
Ukrainian Cup Final 2011
Ukrainian Cup Final 2011
May 2011 sports events in Ukraine